The Escuela Superior Politécnica del Litoral (ESPOL) is a public university located in Guayaquil, Guayas Province in Ecuador. ESPOL has five faculties or schools, fifteen research centers, and several associated centers providing twenty-six undergraduate and ten master's degrees.

History 

The school was created on October 24, 1958, through Executive Decree 1664 by President Camilo Ponce Enriquez, as a higher education institution.

ESPOL was inaugurated on Tuesday, May 19, 1959, and classes began the following Monday, May 25. Its first location was the Casona building of the Universidad de Guayaquil. The area around the historical Peñas area provided a central location in the city, and the buildings in that area were bought by ESPOL with an initial payment of 12 million sucres.

In 1969, the Quinto Guayas Battalion gave ESPOL the area between the Simón Bolívar embankment and Loja Street, where the four engineering departments were located.

In 1973, the Ecuadorian marines moved from their base in Guayaquil, and in their place, new installations for the Facultad de Ingenieria Maritima y Ciencias del Mar were constructed.

Cecilia Paredes Verduga became the vice-rector of ESPOL in 2012 when Sergio Flores Macías was the rector. She was also the director of the materials testings and director of the Polytechnic's Center for Research and Development in Nanotechnology.

In 2017 Cecilia Paredes Verduga was promoted to be ESPOL's rector. It was the first time since ESPOL was founded 59 years ago that it was led by a woman. In 2021 ESPOL was ranked in the top 100 universities in Latin America at number 74.

In 2022 Cecilia Paredes Verduga was re-elected for a second five year term as rector by the students, teaching staff and the employees of ESPOL. She was elected on her manifesto on transforming ESPOL for the digital transformation. Paola Romero Crespo was elected as the vice President.

Campuses 
In 1995, ESPOL moved from its historic campus to the new campus  on the outskirts of the city.

Twenty-first century 
In 2009, ESPOL began construction of the Parque del Conocimiento (Knowledge Park), where the research centers of ESPOL will be located. Also in 2009, ESPOL built buildings to host the prepolitenico (first year general studies). In 2010, ESPOL started the construction of the new EDCON building.

Campuses

Campus de Peñas 
2.5 ha in size and located near the historical center of Guayaquil, Las Peñas campus was the center of academic life. Almost everything was moved to the Gustavo Galindo campus for the 2011–2012 academic year.

Campus Gustavo Galindo 
724 ha in size, the Gustavo Galindo Campus is the main and largest campus. Its location on the Via Perimetral highway eases access to commuting students. The central administration of the university and research centers are located there. Its infrastructure is the result of a development plan, the Plan de Desarrollo (1983–1992) as well as the creation of the new PARCON.

Campus Via de la Costa 
The Campus Via de la Costa, located on the coast of the Santa Elena province, hosts the CENAIM-ESPOL Foundation and maritime-related research and degree programs.

Academics

Schools and colleges

COPOL 
The Polytechnic High School (Colegio Politecnico) is a secondary educational institution linked and colocated with the university. Created in 1995, it is located in the Campus Gustavo Galindo.

ESPAE 
Escuela de Postgrado de Administracion de Empresas.

EDCOM 
Undergraduate academics includes the School of Design and Visual Communication of ESPOL (Escuela de Diseño y Comunicaciónis'), which is associated with the broad field of Arts and Humanities of the International Standard Classification of Education (ISCED).

FCSH 
The Faculty of Social Sciences and Humanities (Facultad de Ciencias Sociales y Humanísticas).

FIMCP 
The Faculty of mechanical  Engineering and Production Sciences (Facultad de Ingenieria Mecánica y Ciencias de la Producción).

FCNM 
The School of Natural Sciences and Math (Facultad de Ciencias Naturales y Matemática).

FICT 
The School of Engineering in Earth Sciences (Facultad de Ingenieria en Ciencias de la Tierra).

FIEC 
The School of Electrical and Computer Engineering (Facultad de Ingenieria Electrica y Computacion). It consists of six departments and offers multiple degrees.

Research

Research centers 
ESPOL research centers include the Center for Systems Research, Development and Innovation (Centro de Investigación, Desarrollo e Innovación de Sistemas, CIDIS); the Information Technology Center (Centro de Tecnologías de Información, CTI), focused onresearch into information and communication technologies; and the Knowledge Park (Parque del Conocimiento, PARCON).

Notable faculty 
Rafael Correa Delgado, President of Ecuador. Visiting professor at FEN from 2001 to 2005.
María del Pilar Cornejo R. de Grunauer, Secretary National for Risk Management, Ecuador. Researcher FIMCM.

References

External links

FIEC

Public universities
Educational institutions established in 1958
Universities in Ecuador
Buildings and structures in Guayaquil
1958 establishments in Ecuador